Farmers of North America ("FNA"), incorporated as Farms and Families of North America Inc., has been characterized as a volume-buyer group, but that function is only one of its strategies for meeting its mission, "Maximizing Farm Profitability."

Recent examples unrelated to "volume buying" widely reported in agriculture media include:
 addressing farm profitability "by lowering transportation and transaction costs"
 working to effect regulatory change that contributes to farm profitability
 testifying before Parliament
 working with the CWB, the new private grain company replacing the Canadian Wheat Board
 creating programs to help farmers hire foreign temporary workers
 organizing farmers to create an opportunity for an equity stake in the fertilizer industry
 creating a unique international sales insurance program, "MarketPower Assurance Program" with Atradius

In October 2014, Farmers of North America expanded into the United States.**

The programs FNA negotiates with suppliers include fertilizers, animal health products, grain storage and handling equipment, fencing, agricultural leasing, oils and lubricants, and tires and management services.

The company is noted for bringing in the first import into the Port of Churchill from Russia, as a demonstration of the ability to cheaply import fertilizers to compete with domestic suppliers which they see as overpriced by predatory sellers.
Another example is the port of Wallaceburg, Ontario revived by FNA's suppliers to import competitive fertilizer for Eastern Canada.

FNA is not a cooperative. Nor is it a retailer, manufacturer or distributor. It is a privately owned for-profit company organized as a business alliance of individual farmers.  It describes itself as "a farm business alliance with the mission of 'Maximizing Farm Profitability.'"

In 2012, FNA announced it has formed a limited partnership, FNA Fertilizer Limited Partnership or FNA FLP, with the intention of building a new nitrogen fertilizer plant in Western Canada. FNA FLP is an independent partnership composed of the farmers who fund it.

Notes

External links 
Farmers of North America
Farmers of North America US

Agriculture companies of Canada
Agriculture companies established in 1998
Canadian companies established in 1998
Companies based in Saskatoon
Fertilizer companies of Canada
1998 establishments in Saskatchewan